Franz Thomas Bruss is  Emeritus Professor of Mathematics at the Université Libre de Bruxelles, where he had been director of "Mathématiques Générales" and co-director of the probability chair, and where he continues his research as invited professor.
His main research activities in mathematics are in the field of probability:
 1/e-law of best choice
 Odds algorithm of optimal stopping
 Galton–Watson processes
 Resource Dependent Branching Processes
 Borel–Cantelli lemma
 Robbins' problem (of optimal stopping)
   Pascal processes
 BRS-inequality

Life 
Thomas Bruss studied mathematics at the Universities Saarbrücken, Cambridge and Sheffield. In 1977 he obtained the Dr. rer. nat at Saarbrücken with his thesis  (Sufficient Conditions for the Extinction of Modified Branching Processes) under Professor Gerd Schmidt, and the legal Dr. en sciences of Belgium one year later. After a scientific career at the University of Namur he moved to the United States and taught at the University of California at Santa Barbara, University of Arizona, Tucson, and then University of California at Los Angeles. In 1990 he returned to Europe as professor of mathematics at Vesalius College, Vrije Universiteit Brussel. In 1993 he was appointed chair of Mathématiques Générales and Probability at the Université Libre de Bruxelles, where he has stayed since then.  He held visiting positions at the University of Strathclyde, Glasgow, University of Zaire, University of Antwerp, Purdue University,  and repeatedly at the Université Catholique de Louvain.

Bruss is fellow of the Alexander von Humboldt Foundation, fellow of the Institute of Mathematical Statistics, elected member of the Tönissteiner Kreis e.V., Germany, and member of the
International Statistical Institute. In 2004 he received the Jacques Deruyts Prize (period 2000–2004) for distinguished contributions to mathematics from the Belgian Academy of Science Académie Royale de Belgique. In 2011, Thomas Bruss was honoured Commandeur de Order of Leopold of Belgium. Under his presidency
(2017-2019) the Belgian Statistical Society has received royal favour and become the Royal Statistical Society of Belgium (in French: Société Royale Belge de Statistique - in Dutch: Koninklijke Belgische Vereniging voor Statistiek.)

See also 
 Bruss–Duerinckx theorem
 Odds algorithm (Bruss Strategie)
 Robbins' problem
 BRS-inequality
 Royal Statistical Society of Belgium

Sources 

Belgian Statistical Society, http://www.sbs-bvs.be/

External links 
 
 
 Thomas Bruss’ Homepage at Département de Mathématique of the Université libre de Bruxelles
 His publication list on the Université libre de Bruxelles platform

1949 births
Living people
20th-century German mathematicians
21st-century German mathematicians
Probability theorists
Academic staff of the Université libre de Bruxelles